Flight Lieutenant Nicholas Gresham Cooke, DFC (26 August 1913 – 31 May 1940), nicknamed "Lanky", was a Royal Air Force pilot and Second World War flying ace most notable as an ace in a day. He was killed in action over the Dunkirk evacuation beaches.

Early life
Cooke was the son of Arthur and Lucy Vivien Cooke of Up Hall, Cherry Hinton, Cambridge. His father was  Dr Arthur Cooke, F.R.C.S., senior surgeon to Addenbrooke's Hospital, and a brother was Roger Gresham Cooke, MP.

He was educated at Marlborough College and Trinity College, Cambridge. Following this, he became an aeronautical engineer and learned to fly with Air Service Training Limited gaining a Civil Pilot's Licence (No. 12947) on 15 July 1935.

The following year, Cooke joined the Royal Air Force and passed out from the Royal Air Force College Cranwell as an acting pilot officer on 23 March 1936. On 10 January 1937, he joined No. 46 Squadron RAF, a recently re-formed fighter squadron, flying Gloster Gauntlet Mark II aircraft, from RAF Digby in Lincolnshire. On 24 February 1937, he was confirmed as a pilot officer. On 15 August 1938, he was posted to No. 23 Group RAF based at Grantham, Lincolnshire, as personal assistant to the commander, Air Vice Marshal Lawrence Pattinson, and was promoted to flying officer on 27 August 1940.

Wartime service

When No. 264 Squadron RAF was re-formed at RAF Sutton Bridge in October 1939, Cooke joined as a flight commander, to fly the Boulton Paul Defiant. An unusual fighter for its era, the Defiant had a single engine and was armed with four Browning .303 Mark II machine-guns, in a rear turret operated by an air gunner but had no fixed forward firing guns. In early operations, the Defiant was often mistaken for the similar shaped Hawker Hurricane by German pilots who dived to attack from above and behind, into the blind spot of a Hurricane but directly into the fire from the Defiant turret.

On posting to No. 264 Squadron, Cooke teamed up with 348039 Acting Corporal Albert Lippett, a married 37-year-old RAF veteran originally from Great Yarmouth, who lived at Dunfermline. Lippett had joined the RAF aged 17 and completed a 12-year engagement before discharge, only to rejoin for four more years in 1935–39. He had been working in an aircraft factory until he was recalled for service in September 1939. On 12 May 1940, operating over the Dutch coast, Cooke and Lippett shot down a Heinkel He 111 bomber and on 27 May 1940 they joined several other Defiants to destroy another over Dunkirk. They had a big success at about 15:15 hours on 29 May 1940, in two patrols above the Dunkirk beaches, when they shot down two Messerschmitt Bf 109 fighters, a Messerschmitt Bf 110 twin engine fighter and then five Junkers Ju 87 Stuka dive bombers at about 19:30 hours. During the afternoon, they joined in the destruction of two Junkers Ju 88 bombers, which brought their score to nine victories and three shared.

Two days later, while in action over the Dunkirk beaches against a formation of Heinkel He 111 bombers and escorting Messerschmitt Bf 109 fighters, their flight of Defiants was attacked and Cooke and Lippett's Boulton Paul Defiant Mark I (serial number L6975), was shot down. Both men were lost when it crashed into the sea and were listed as killed in action.
He has no known grave and is commemorated on the Runnymede Memorial. A memorial was later erected to Cooke at Blakeney in Norfolk.

Honours and awards

 14 June 1940 – Flight Lieutenant Nicholas Gresham Cooke (37652), was awarded the Distinguished Flying Cross

 14 June 1940 – 348030 Acting Corporal Albert Lippett was awarded the Distinguished Flying Medal

See also
 List of World War II flying aces

References

Bibliography
 
 
 
 
 
 
 
 
 

1913 births
1940 deaths
English aviators
People from Cherry Hinton
Royal Air Force officers
Aviators killed by being shot down
Aviators killed in aviation accidents or incidents in France
British World War II flying aces
Royal Air Force personnel killed in World War II
Recipients of the Distinguished Flying Cross (United Kingdom)
People educated at Marlborough College
Alumni of Trinity College, Cambridge
People from Blakeney, Norfolk